The Commissioner for Children and Young People (Scotland) Act 2003 was passed by the Scottish Parliament in March 2003 to make provision for a Children's ombudsman. It established the Children and Young People's Commissioner Scotland with the general function of promoting and safeguarding the rights of children and young people.

History
The Education, Culture and Sport Committee looked into the need for a Children’s Commissioner in 2001. The consultation period ran from May 2001 and children were invited to give evidence in Holyrood. A report was published in February 2002. A further report published in July 2002 by the Education, Culture and Sport Committee proposed a Bill to appoint a Children’s Commissioner. The bill was published on 5 December.

The bill was introduced to Parliament on 15 January 2003. A subordinate legislation subcommittee was convened. The legislation was passed towards the end of the 1st Scottish Parliament on 26 March 2003. It received Royal Assent on 1 May 2003.

References

External links
 Session 1 Bills: Commissioner for Children and Young People (Scotland) Act 2003 at www.parliament.scot

Acts of the Scottish Parliament 2003
Children's rights in Scotland